"U Build Me Up" is a song by the German pop group Bro'Sis. It was written by Blair MacKichan and produced by Fredrik "Fredro" Ödesjö for the band's third studio album Showtime (2004). The mid-tempo track was released as the album's only physical single and reached the top twenty of the German Singles Chart.

Formats and track listings

Credits and personnel

 Ross Antony – vocals
 Mats Berntoft – bass, guitar
 Hila Bronstein – vocals
 Henrik Brunberg – radio editing
 Nik Hafeman – supervising producer

 Shaham Joyce – vocals
 Toby Lindell – mixing
 Faiz Mangat – vocals
 Fredrik "Fredro" Ödesjö – production, recording
 Giovanni Zarrella – vocals

Charts

References

2004 songs
Bro'Sis songs
Polydor Records singles
Songs written by Blair MacKichan